Blansky's Beauties is an American sitcom television series and ostensible spin-off of Happy Days that aired on ABC from February 12 to June 27, 1977. The main character of the series was introduced on an episode of Happy Days, then set in the early 1960s, but the show is set in the present day of 1977. The series was a ratings flop and was cancelled after only 13 episodes.

Synopsis

Nancy Walker played Howard Cunningham's visiting cousin Nancy Blansky from Las Vegas on the February 4, 1977, episode of Happy Days. Blansky's Beauties premiered the following week, on February 12, 1977.

Nancy Blansky (Walker) was a longtime Las Vegas showbiz vet (since the 1950s) and current den mother to a bevy of beautiful Las Vegas showgirls. In addition to keeping order in the chaotic apartment complex where they all lived, Nancy staged the girls' big numbers at the Oasis Hotel.

Emilio (Johnny Desmond), the maître d', was Nancy's boyfriend. To help Nancy defray costs of her apartment, Ethel "Sunshine" Akalino (Lynda Goodfriend) and Bambi (Caren Kaye) shared it with her, along with her nephews Joey DeLuca (Eddie Mekka), a choreographer, and leering, 12-year-old ("going on 28") Anthony DeLuca (Scott Baio). Anthony was forever trying to impress Bambi, who much to his chagrin treated him like a kid brother, as did almost all of Nancy's girls. Also sharing Nancy's apartment was a huge Great Dane named Blackjack who was shown in the opening credits playing blackjack.

Links to parent show and other spin-offs

Eddie Mekka's character Joey DeLuca was a younger cousin to Carmine Ragusa, Mekka's 1950s-era character on Laverne & Shirley. During production of Blansky's Beauties, Mekka continued in his starring roles on both series, a rare occurrence of one actor assuming two regular scripted roles, in two different prime-time series, at the same time.  The series' star, Nancy Walker, had just finished several seasons of the same situation in which she had co-starred simultaneously in both McMillan & Wife and Rhoda, while also maintaining her ongoing role as diner waitress Rosie, the spokesman for Bounty paper towels, which she continued during Blansky's Beauties.

In episode 1 ("Blansky's Biking Beauty") Joey introduced Nancy Blansky to stunt motorcyclist Pinky Tuscadero (Roz Kelly), who was instantly hired for Nancy's stage show. Pinky wore the same outfit as in her Happy Days episodes, though her hair was now in a '70s-style shag cut. She looked as though she had not aged in 20 years.

The show also implied a link to then-ongoing show Laverne & Shirley; in the episode "Nancy Remembers Laverne," Nancy recalls working with a clumsy girl named Laverne DeFazio (Penny Marshall's character on Laverne & Shirley) back around 1957. She discovered that, despite her clumsiness, Laverne was a great dancer and Nancy offered her a job on the spot, which Laverne declined.

Pat Morita, after the failure of his series Mr. T and Tina, was added to the cast as Arnold, the character he originated on Happy Days. As with Pinky Tuscadero, he seemed not to have aged in 20 years' time. Here he ran a coffee shop, whereas in Happy Days, he owned the diner. Morita would re-join the cast of Happy Days five years later, while his replacement on that series, Al Molinaro, would repeat Morita's career move at that time by joining another Happy Days spin-off, Joanie Loves Chachi.

After the end of Blansky's Beauties, Lynda Goodfriend and Scott Baio would join the cast of Happy Days at the start of the 1977–78 season. Goodfriend and Baio, along with their Blansky's Beauties co-stars Caren Kaye, Shirley Kirkes and Elaine Bolton, would appear in a similarly plotted pilot, Legs, for NBC in 1978, using different character names. This project would be revised further and appear on the network as Who's Watching the Kids? in the fall of that year, lasting half a season.

Garry Marshall, creator of Blansky's Beauties and the aforementioned Happy Days, Laverne & Shirley, and Joanie Loves Chachi, et al., had a recurring role as Nancy's employer, the enigmatic Mr. Smith.

Cast

 Nancy Walker as Nancy Blansky
 Caren Kaye as Bambi Benton
 Lynda Goodfriend as Ethel "Sunshine" Akalino (actress later moved back to Happy Days as Lori Beth Allen, later Lori Beth Cunningham)
 Johnny Desmond as Emilio
 Eddie Mekka as Joey DeLuca (actor simultaneously on Laverne & Shirley as Joey's cousin, Carmine Ragusa)
 Scott Baio as Anthony DeLuca (actor later moved to Happy Days as Chachi Arcola)
 George Pentecost as Horace "Stubbs" Wilmington
 Taaffe O'Connell as Hillary S. Prentiss
 Rhonda Bates as Arkansas
 Bond Gideon as Lovely Carson
 Gerri Reddick as Jackie Outlaw
 Shirley Kirkes as Gladys "Cochise" Littlefeather
 Antoinette Yuskis as Sylvia Silver
 Jill Owens as Misty Karamazov
 Elaine Bolton as Bridget Muldoon
 Pat Morita as Arnold (actor and character returned to Happy Days, where character originated)
 Garry Marshall as "Mr. Smith"

Episodes

References

External links
 

1977 American television series debuts
1977 American television series endings
1970s American sitcoms
American Broadcasting Company original programming
English-language television shows
Happy Days
Television series about show business
Television series by CBS Studios
Television shows set in the Las Vegas Valley
American television spin-offs